"Oranges and Lemons" is a nursery rhyme.

Oranges and Lemons may also refer to:
 Oranges & Lemons (band), a Japanese pop band
 Oranges & Lemons (album), an album by XTC
 Oranges and Lemons (film), a 1923 film starring Stan Laurel
 Oranges and Lemons (1991 film), a 1991 British television film by Kay Adshead in the anthology series ScreenPlay
 "Oranges and Lemons", an episode of Teletubbies

See also
 Orange and Lemons, a Filipino rock band